Raping the Corpse is an EP by death metal band Desecration. The album contains remixes and live recordings and was released to promote the 2003 release of Gore and PerVersion 2.

Track listing
"Raping The Corpse (Remix)"
"Asphyxiate On Blood (Live)"
"Death You'll Face (Live)"
"Let's Have A Hanging (Live)"

Reviews
Raping the Corpse received a rating of 4.4/5 at Metal Ireland.

References

Desecration (band) albums
2005 live albums
2005 EPs